Pucillo is a surname. Notable people with the surname include:

Lou Pucillo (born 1936), American basketball player 
Mike Pucillo (born 1979), American football player

See also
Puccio

References

Italian-language surnames